The Greece lobby in the United States refers to the lawyers, public relation firms  and professional lobbyists under the umbrella of the American Hellenic Institute that works behalf of the interests of the government of Greece. The formal establishment of the Greek Lobby is estimated to have started with the arrival of the first Greek Americans in 1768.
The aim of the Greek lobby is to promote the national interests of Greece in the United States Congress and to connect the whole of the Greek American community which amounts to approximately 1% of the whole US population.
With the beginning of the Credit crunch crisis in 2008 various organizations including high power individuals who mainly come from an American background are lobbying in support of Greek-U.S. ties.

Working in cooperation with the Israeli lobby
Since the beginning of the 20th century, Greek and Jewish lobbies in the US were working in parallel in order to prevent any rise in tensions in the unstable Eastern Mediterranean. Greek and Jewish lobbies had maintained ties even before the establishment of the bilateral relations of Greece with Israel. American Jewish Committee delegates have visited Greece and maintain contacts with various Greek officials from both political and military backgrounds.
In their annual meeting in New York City in December 2012, the Greek and Israeli lobbies offered assurances that relations between Greece and Israel, and to some extent Cyprus, remain strong due to their nations' shared interest in democracy and stability in the Eastern Mediterranean. Chairman of the Board of Trustees, Nicholas Karacostas, together with the other Greek American representatives announced that both lobbying groups will remain in contact ahead of the upcoming extraction of natural gas in both Israel and Cyprus, as part of their wider Energy Triangle.

See also
 Greece–United States relations
 Greece-Israel relations
 Cyprus-Israel relations
 Energy Triangle

References

Further reading
 Zervakis, Peter A. "The Greek Diaspora in the United States and American Involvement in Greece after World War II," Modern Greek Studies Yearbook (1998), Vol. 14, pp 213–240.
 Zervakis, Peter A. "The Role of the 'Justice For Greece Committee' for the American Involvement in Greece after World War II," Balkan Studies (1997) 38#1 pp 159–196

External links
Embassy and Consulates
Embassy
General Consulate Los Angeles

Greek-American organisations
AHEPA home page -  American Hellenic Educational Progressive Association
The Hellenic Society "Paideia"
Greek America Foundation
National Hellenic Society
Onassis Foundation (USA)
Hellenic Times Scholarship Fund 

Greece–United States relations
Greek-American history